The Urubamba brown titi monkey (Plecturocebus urubambensis) is a species of titi monkey, a type of New World monkey, endemic to Peru.

Taxonomy 
Populations in this species were formerly classified within the brown titi (P. brunneus), but a 2015 study found it to be a distinct, undescribed species that also belonged in a different species group of Plecturocebus from P. brunneus (the P. donacophilus group), and thus described it as P. urubambensis. The results of this study were followed by the IUCN Red List, ITIS, and American Society of Mammalogists.

Distribution 
This species is endemic to Peru, where it is found east of the Tambo River and west of the Urubamba, Manú, and Madre de Dios rivers.

Description 
This species is not as grizzled as P. brunneus, and also has a varying amount of black on the head.

References 

Urubamba brown titi
Mammals of Peru
Endemic fauna of Peru
Urubamba brown titi